M. Rajangam (born 1939) is a senior leader of the Indian National Congress, and was a member of the Tamil Nadu Assembly representing Thiruvidamarudur (State Assembly Constituency) from 1984 to 1988. He has been associated with spiritual (thiruvaduthurai athinam, thirupanandal athinam, dharmapuram athinam, kanch sankaracharya mutt), political and political in delta districts of Tamil Nadu. He was also the union chairman of thiruvidaimarudur.

He wrote his autobiography Ninaivgulm Pagirvugulum. He maintains a website on Union Shipping Minister G. K. Varsan at gkvasan.in. He is the district leader for the Thanjavur Congress Party.

Positions

He first met Jawaharlal Nehru, prime minister in Kumbakonam in 1955.

In 1972 he was jailed for toddyshops boycott announced by Kamrajar and he was again jailed in 1973 in Trichy for the call of protests by Kamarjar.
In 1977 he was again arrested, and this time  lodged in Vellore, for protest against arrest of Indira Gandhi.

He was Thiruvidaimarudur constituency legislative member representing the Congress Party for 1985–1988.
In 1989 he contested legislative election representing congress and was defeated.

For 1995–1996 he was undivided Thanjavur districts congress president.
For 1996-1998 he was Thanjavur district Tamil Maanila Congress (T.M.C) president

In 1999 he was jailed for protest against price rise in trichy.

1998-2000: zonal campaigning committee chairman, T.M.C.

2000–2002: Thanjavur district congress president

1996, 2001, 2006: lost the opportunity of m.l.a due to various reasons.

References

1939 births
Living people
India MPs 1971–1977
Lok Sabha members from Tamil Nadu
People from Dindigul district
Tamil Nadu MLAs 1985–1989